Kiana Williams (born April 9, 1999) is an American basketball player who last played for the Connecticut Sun in the WNBA. She was drafted by the Storm with the 18th pick in the 2021 WNBA draft after playing college basketball at Stanford.

College career

Senior season 
In her senior season, Williams was named an All-American by the United States Basketball Writers Association, Associated Press, and Women's Basketball Coaches Association. In the 2021 Pac-12 Conference women's basketball tournament, she put up 26 points in the championship match and was named the tournament's Most Outstanding Player.

With the 2021 NCAA Division I women's basketball tournament being held in her hometown San Antonio, Williams helped lead the Cardinal to their first national championship since 1992 and was named the tournament's Most Outstanding Player in the Alamo Region. After winning the national championship, Williams and her Stanford teammates donated the ping-pong table the university bought for them in the tournament bubble to the Eastside Boys and Girls Club, where the San Antonio native Williams had spent time growing up.

Williams declared for the WNBA draft at the end of the season, finishing her collegiate career at the program's career 3-point leader and did not miss a game, starting 128 consecutive games over her career.

Professional career

Seattle Storm (2021)
Williams was drafted by the Seattle Storm in the second round of the 2021 WNBA draft with the 18th overall pick. Considered a longshot to make the Storm roster with one of the deepest backcourts in the WNBA, Williams made the final roster for the opening game of the 2021 season. She was released from the Seattle Storm roster on June 28, 2021. On October 25, 2021 she signed to play overseas with the Adelaide Lightning.

Phoenix Mercury 
On March 1, 2022, Williams signed a training camp contract with the Phoenix Mercury prior to the 2022 WNBA season. She was ultimately released at the end of training camp and did not make the roster.

Seattle Storm (2022) 
Williams signed a hardship contract with the Storm on May 27, 2022, and played 3 games with the Storm before being released from her hardship.

Connecticut Sun
On July 27, 2022, Williams signed a 7-Day Contract with the Connecticut Sun.

National team career 
Williams played for the United States women's national basketball team at the 2019 Pan American Games, where they earned a silver medal after placing second.

Career statistics

WNBA 

|-
| style="text-align:left;" | 2021
| style="text-align:left;" | Seattle
| 10 || 0 || 3.5 || .143 || .167 || 1.000 || 0.4 || 0.2 || 0.1 || 0.0 || 0.2 || 0.4
|-
| style="text-align:left;" | 2022
| style="text-align:left;" | Seattle
| 3 || 0 || 9.0 || .250 || .250 || .000 || 0.7 || 1.7 || 0.0 || 0.0 || 0.7 || 1.7
|-
| style="text-align:left;" | 2022
| style="text-align:left;" | Connecticut
| 1 || 0 || 3.0 || .000 || .000 || .000 || 0.0 || 0.0 || 0.0 || 0.0 || 0.0 || 0.0
|-
| align="left" | Career
| align="left" | 2 years, 2 teams
| 14 || 0 || 4.6 || .200 || .200 || 1.000 || 0.4 || 0.5 || 0.1 || 0.0 || 0.3 || 0.6

College 

|-
| style="text-align:left;" | 2017–18
| style="text-align:left;" | Stanford
| 35 || 26 || 25.7 || .414 || .384 || .818 || 1.7 || 1.9 || 0.9 || 0.1 || 1.1 || 10.4
|-
| style="text-align:left;" | 2018–19
| style="text-align:left;" | Stanford
| 36 || 36 || 34.5 || .422 || .367 || .793 || 2.8 || 4.7 || 1.2 || 0.1 || 2.4 || 14.3
|-
| style="text-align:left;" | 2019–20
| style="text-align:left;" | Stanford
| 33 || 33 || 34.2 || .416 || .347 || .840 || 3.2 || 3.8 || 1.1 || 0.0 || 2.1 || 15.0
|-
| style="text-align:left;" | 2020–21
| style="text-align:left;" | Stanford
| 33 || 33 || 32.3 || .410 || .383 || .895 || 2.0 || 3.1 || 1.3 || 0.0 || 1.5 || 14.0
|-
| style="text-align:center;" colspan=2 | Career
| 137 || 128 || 31.6 || .416 || .370 || .833 || 2.4 || 3.4 || 1.1 || 0.1 || 1.8 || 13.4

Personal life 
Williams is the daughter of LaChelle and Michael Williams and has three older brothers. During Stanford's tournament run in 2021, Williams' father, a former barbecue joint owner, delivered homemade meals to the team's hotel.

References

External links 
 
 
 Stanford Cardinal profile
 USA Basketball profile

1999 births
Living people
All-American college women's basketball players
American women's basketball players
Basketball players at the 2019 Pan American Games
Basketball players from San Antonio
Connecticut Sun players
Medalists at the 2019 Pan American Games
Pan American Games medalists in basketball
Pan American Games silver medalists for the United States
Point guards
Seattle Storm draft picks
Seattle Storm players
Shooting guards
Stanford Cardinal women's basketball players
United States women's national basketball team players